John William Foust (born September 5, 1951) is an American politician serving as a member of the Fairfax County, Virginia Board of Supervisors from the Dranesville district. The district includes McLean, Great Falls, Herndon and portions of Vienna and Falls Church. Foust made an unsuccessful bid as the 2014 Democratic candidate for Virginia's 10th congressional district in the U.S. Congress.

Personal life and education
Foust grew up in Johnstown, Pennsylvania, the oldest of five brothers. After graduating from Bishop McCort High School in Johnstown, he became the first person in his family to attend college and earned a bachelor's degree in economics from the University of Pittsburgh in 1973. To pay for his education, he worked each summer as a laborer in the steel mills and on the railroad tracks. Foust earned an M.B.A. from the West Virginia College of Graduate Studies in 1976, and a J.D. degree from George Washington University Law School in 1981.

In 1984, John married Dr. Marilyn Jerome, a partner in Foxhall Ob-Gyn Associates in Washington, D.C. They have two sons, Matthew, a graduate of Vanderbilt University's Peabody College of Education and Patrick, a graduate of the Georgetown University Walsh School of Foreign Service.

Career
After graduating from the University of Pittsburgh, Foust worked full-time for C&P Companies, performing and supervising economic, cost analysis, and regulatory studies. During this time, he attended night law school classes. He then practiced construction law in Northern Virginia until his election to the Board of Supervisors.

He served as the President of the McLean Citizens Association, and as Chairman of the Environmental Quality Advisory Council's legislative committee. He also served as the Chairman of the Chain Bridge District of the Boy Scouts of America.

Foust lost the June 1999 Democratic primary for the 34th District seat in the Virginia House of Delegates to Carole Herrick, who lost the November election to incumbent Republican Vincent F. Callahan Jr.

Foust ran against Republican Joan Dubois for the Dranesville District seat on the Fairfax County Board of Supervisors vacated by Stuart Mendelsohn in 2003, losing by 510 votes out of the over 23,000 cast. In a 2007 rematch, Foust defeated Dubois with 53.5% of the vote. He then won re-election against Dennis D. Husch in 2011. Foust won reelection to a third term on November 3, 2015, defeating his Republican opponent.

As a member of the Board of Supervisors, Foust serves as the Chairman of the Board's Audit Committee and as Vice Chairman of the Board's Budget and Transportation Committees. In addition, Foust serves as Chairman of the Fairfax County Economic Advisory Commission and also serves on the Northern Virginia Transportation Commission, the Route 28 Transportation Improvement Commission, the Mosaic Community Development Authority, the Dulles Rail Phase I and Phase II Transportation Improvement District Commissions, the Metropolitan Washington Council of Governments, and the National Capital Region Emergency Preparedness Council.

He plans to retire from the Board of Supervisors at the end of his term in January 2024.

U.S. House campaign
Following the retirement announcement of Republican Frank Wolf, Foust ran for Congress unsuccessfully in Virginia's 10th congressional district in 2014.

Some endorsers of John Foust included the American Federation of Government Employees, The Human Rights Campaign, Everytown For Gun Safety, and the National Education Association.

During the campaign, Foust was criticized for saying of his opponent, Barbara Comstock, "I don't think she's even had a real job." When confronted in a TV interview about his comments, he said: "The problem is, those jobs were so hyper-partisan, and that was the point I was making."

Electoral history

See also
Fairfax County, Virginia
Dranesville, Virginia

External links
Washington Post bio
Official Fairfax County bio
County Campaign Website
Congressional Campaign Website

References

1951 births
20th-century American lawyers
21st-century American lawyers
21st-century American politicians
Candidates in the 2014 United States elections
George Washington University Law School alumni
Living people
Members of the Fairfax County Board of Supervisors
People from McLean, Virginia
Politicians from Johnstown, Pennsylvania
University of Pittsburgh alumni
Virginia Democrats
Virginia lawyers